Mirko Salvi (born 14 February 1994) is a Swiss professional footballer who plays as goalkeeper for Basel.

Youth football
Born in Yverdon-les-Bains, Salvi started his youth football with Yverdon-Sport. In 2009, he transferred to Basel and played in their U16 team where he won the Swiss Championship at U16 level. He also played in the Basel U-18 team and one year in their U-21 team before he signed a three year professional contract in May 2012 and joined their first team squad.

Club career
At the end of the Swiss Super League season 2012–13 he won the Championship title and was Swiss Cup runner up with Basel. In the 2012–13 UEFA Europa League Basel advanced as far as the semi-finals, there being matched against the reigning UEFA Champions League holders Chelsea, but they were knocked out, losing both home and away ties, beaten 2-5 on aggregate. At the end of the Swiss Super League season 2013–14 he again won the Championship title and was Swiss Cup silver medal winner for the second time. During this period, as third Basel goalkeeper, he played regularly in their U-21 team and in some test games but never a league match.

On 19 May 2014, Basel announced that they were loaning out Salvi to Biel in the Swiss Challenge League, so that he could gain first-team experience in an environment somewhat more competitive than with the Reserves in the 1. Liga Promotion. He became their starting goalie and played his Challenge League debut in the Stade de Genève on 20 July 2014 in a 1–2 away defeat against Servette. After one year loan, in which he played 35 of the possible 36 Challenge League games, he returned to Basel as their first team third goalkeeper.

Salvi made his professional debut for Basel in the closing match of the 2015–16 UEFA Europa League group stage against Lech Poznań on 10 December 2015. He came on as a substitute just before half-time to replace injured Germano Vailati during the 1–0 away victory.

On 15 June 2021, he returned to his first club Yverdon-Sport.

On 10 June 2022, Salvi returned to Basel on a two-year contract.

International career
Salvi was born in Switzerland and is of Italian descent. Salvi made diverse appearances for the Switzerland U-15 and U16 national teams. He played his debut for their U17 team in a 1–0 away defeat against the Belgium U17 team on 26 August 2010. He played his debut for their U18 team in a 2–0 away win against Estonia U18 on 1 September 2011.

Salvi played his debut for their Swiss U21 team in a 1–1 away draw on 14 November 2014 against Germany U21 at the Karl-Liebknecht-Stadion in Potsdam.

Titles and Honours
Basel
 Swiss Champion at U16 level: 2009–10
 Swiss Super League champion: 2012–13, 2013–14
 Swiss Cup runner up: 2012–13, 2013–14

References

External links
 
 
 Profile on the web site SFL

1994 births
Living people
People from Yverdon-les-Bains
Association football goalkeepers
Swiss men's footballers
Switzerland youth international footballers
Switzerland under-21 international footballers
Swiss people of Italian descent
FC Basel players
FC Biel-Bienne players
FC Lugano players
Grasshopper Club Zürich players
FC Luzern players
Yverdon-Sport FC players
Swiss Super League players
Swiss Challenge League players
Sportspeople from the canton of Vaud